Play Dusty for Me is the second solo album by English singer and songwriter David Westlake.

Context
David Westlake recorded Play Dusty for Me in August 2001 in Kilkenny, Ireland. The album was produced by Cormac Moore.

First album Westlake was released in 1987 on Creation Records. Luke Haines describes it as “a minor classic”.

Between 1985 and 1991 Westlake was in English indie band The Servants.

Release history
Play Dusty for Me (Mahlerphone, 2002) was a self-pressed album released in a limited issue that quickly sold out.

In 2008, Westlake gave “My Ice Queen”, an outtake from the album recording session, to a charity compilation for the benefit of Yorkhill Children's Foundation, based at the Royal Hospital for Sick Children, Glasgow.

Play Dusty for Me was reissued in 2010 and 2015.

Track listing

“Play Dusty for Me” – 3:30
“Song for John” – 2:02
“Back on Track” – 4:28
“An Ocean Away” – 3:50
“Say When” – 2:51
“Stupid Love” – 3:33
“The Lonely City” – 2:34
“I Can't Give You the Life You Want” – 3:38
“Nowhere Days” – 3:03
“I Die for Love” – 3:40
“Patience” – 4:40
“Even If” – 4:22
“Life on the Edge” – 3:44
“Hi You” – 3:55
“Life Goes On” – 4:20

Personnel
David Westlake – vocals and guitar
Dan Cross – guitar
Cormac Moore – bass
Willis Moore – drums

References

2002 albums
David Westlake albums